The Sko or Skou languages are a small language family spoken by about 7000 people, mainly along the Vanimo coast of Sandaun Province in Papua New Guinea, with a few being inland from this area and at least one just across the border in the Indonesian province of Papua (formerly known as Irian Jaya).

Typology

Tone
Skou languages are unusual among Papuan languages for being tonal; all Skou languages possess contrastive tone. Vanimo, for example, has three tones, high, mid, low.

Example minimal sets illustrating tonal contrasts in various Skou languages:

I’saka: ẽyH ‘louse’, weyL ‘butterfly’, weyLH ‘house’, weyHL ‘language’
Barupu: eH ‘tooth’, eL ‘garden’, eHL ‘mosquito’, eHLH ‘write’
Wutung: hoH ‘roof thatch made from sago palm fronds’, hoL ‘star’, hoHL ‘grease’
Skou: taH ‘grass’, taL ‘hair’, taHL ‘arrow’

Lakes Plain languages, spoken in a discontiguous area to the southwest, are also tonal. Because of the apparent phonological similarities and sharing of stable basic words such as ‘louse’, Foley speculates the potential likelihood of a distant relationship shared between the Skou and Lakes Plain families, but no formal proposals linking the two families have been made due to insufficient evidence. Additionally according to Foley, based on some lexical and phonological similarities, the Keuw language (currently classified as a language isolate) may also possibly share a deep relationship with the Lakes Plain languages. Like the Lakes Plain languages, Keuw also possesses constrative tone.

Lepki, Kaure, and Kembra, spoken in mountainous inland regions of the Indonesia-PNG border to the southwest of the Skou-speaking area, are also tonal.

Morphology
Skou languages can be isolating or polysynthetic.

Isolating structure: Dumo, an Inner Skou language
Polysynthetic structure: Barupu, a Piore River language

Classification 
Skou languages were first linked by G. Frederici in 1912. In 1941, K.H. Thomas expanded the family to its current extent.

The Sko family is not accepted by Søren Wichmann (2013), who splits it into two separate groups.

Donohue (2007) and Donohue and Crowther (2005) list Nouri as a mixed language having features of both the Piore River and Serra Hills subgroups.

Sko (Laycock 1975)
Laycock posited two branches, Vanimo and Krisa:  
Vanimo branch – Skou, Sangke (Nyao), Wutung, Vanimo (Dumo)
Krisa branch – I’saka (Krisa), Rawo, Puari, Barupu (Warapu)

Skou (Ross 2005)
However, Krisa is poorly supported and Malcolm Ross abandoned it,
I’saka (Krisa)
Barupu (Warapu)
Puari
Rawo
Womo
Vanimo branch: Skou (Tumawo), Leitre, Sangke (Nyao), Wutung, Vanimo (Dumo), Dusur

Macro-Skou (Donohue 2002)
Mark Donohue proposed a subclassification based on areal diffusion he called Macro-Skou. 
Isaka
Skou–Serra–Piore linkage
Piore River: Nori (strongly influenced by Womo), Barupu
Serra Hills
Puare
Rawo – Main Serra: Rawo, Womo
 Skou (Vanimo) family
Skou
Eastern Skou / Vanimo
Leitre
West Coast
Border: Nyao, Wutung
Vanimo proper: Dumo, Dusur

Donohue (2004) notes that is unclear if extinct Nouri is in the Piore River or Serra Hills branch.

Sko (Foley 2018)
Foley (2018) provides the following classification.

Foley's Inner Sko corresponds to Donohue's Western Skou.

Miller (2017)
The Piore River branch was renamed Lagoon in Miller (2017). The older names of the Piore River languages were from village names; Miller has since renamed them as Bauni, Uni, Bouni, and Bobe, though it is debatable whether they are all distinct languages.

Lagoon (also Piore River)
Bauni (Poo and Barapu/Warapu villages)
Uni (Ramo village)
Bouni (Sumo village)
Bobe (Nouri village)

Usher (2020)
Usher groups the languages as follows, with each node being a reconstructable clade, and giving the family a geographic label rather than naming it after a single language. The Eastern languages are typologically quite distinct from the Western languages and I'saka.

Pronouns
The pronouns Ross reconstructs for proto-Skou are,

{| class=wikitable
|-
| I || *na || we || *ne
|-
| thou || *me || you || ?
|-
| he || *ka || they (M) || *ke
|-
| she || *bo || they (F) || *de
|}

The Skou languages also have a dual, with a distinction between inclusive and exclusive we, but the forms are not reconstructable for the proto-language.

Pronouns in individual Skou languages:

{| 
! pronoun !! I'saka !! Barupu !! Wutung !! Skou
|-
! 1.SG
| nana || něná || niɛ || nì
|-
! 2.SG
| mama || měmá || mɛ || mè
|-
! 3M.SG
| kia || yá || ʔe || ke
|-
! 3F.SG
| umu || bó || ce || pe
|-
! 1.PL
| numu || měmí || nɛtu || ne
|-
! 2.PL
| yumu || mŏpú || ɛtu || e
|-
! 3.PL
| ie || yéi || tɛtu || te
|}

Cognates
Sko family cognates (I'saka, Barupu, Wutung, Skou) listed by Foley (2018):

{| 
|+ Sko family cognates
! gloss !! I'saka !! Barupu !! Wutung !! Skou
|-
| ‘hand’ || dou || eno || noʔɛ̃ || no
|-
| ‘tooth’ || kũ || e || ʔũ || kə̃
|-
| ‘breast’ || ni || to || no || no
|-
| ‘woman’ || bu || bom || wũawũa || pɛɨma
|-
| ‘bird’ || yũ || ru || tĩ || tã
|-
| ‘dog’ ||  || naki || naʔi || nake
|-
| ‘water’ || wi || pi ||  || pa
|-
| ‘old’ || tuni || tɔra ||  || rõtoto
|-
| ‘eat’ || a || ou || (u)a || a
|}

A cognate set for 'louse' in Sko languages (reconstructing roughly to *nipi in Proto-Sko) as compiled by Dryer (2022):

{| class="wikitable"
! Language (group) !! louse
|-
| Serra Hills || ni, nip, nipi
|-
| Warapu || mi
|-
| Western Sko || pi, fi, pĩ
|-
| Isaka || ẽĩ
|}

Vocabulary comparison
The following basic vocabulary words are from Voorhoeve (1971, 1975), as cited in the Trans-New Guinea database. More recent data from Marmion (2010) has been added for Wutung and from Donohue (2002) (as cited in the ASJP Database) for Skou.

{| class="wikitable sortable"
! gloss !! Wutung(Marmion 2010) !! Wutung(Voorhoeve 1975) !! Skou(Donohue 2002) !! Skou(Voorhoeve 1971, 1975)
|-
! head
| hlúqbùr || kəsu. || rebi || röbe; rö́e
|-
! hair
| tàng || ta || ta || ta
|-
! ear
| qúrlùr ||  || le || lö
|-
! eye
| lúrtô || rəto ||  lu; luto  || lutɔ̀
|-
! nose
|  ||  ||  ha || ha
|-
! tooth
| qúng || kə ||  ke* || kö
|-
! leg
|  || knaŋku ||  || tãe
|-
! louse
|  || hehe || fi || fi
|-
! dog
| náqî || naki || nakE || nakɛ́
|-
! pig
| cà || tyamu ||  || pálɛ
|-
! bird
| tîng ||  || ta*  || tåå; tãŋã
|-
! egg
|  || kuekue || ku || tã kò
|-
! blood
| hnjie || hi || hi || hi
|-
! bone
| qêy || e || e || ee
|-
! skin
| mà; nua || na || ro || nö re; nö rɔ̀
|-
! breast
| no ||  || no* || nɔ
|-
! tree
|  || ri || ri; rite || ri
|-
! man
| panyua || teba || kE ba || ba; keba; kébanè; teba
|-
! woman
| wungawunga ||   || 3mE || pemɛ̀
|-
! sun
| hlàng || hrã || ra* || rãã́
|-
! moon
|  ||   || kE || ke
|-
! water
| câ || tya || pa || pa
|-
! fire
| hie || hae || ra || ra
|-
! stone
| wólòng || koŋũ || wu* || hũ; wũ
|-
! eat
| sàqèngpùà ||  || a*  || kã; pã; tã
|-
! one
| ófà || ofa || ali* || alì
|-
! two
| hnyûmò || hime || hi*tu* || hĩ́to
|}

See also
Papuan languages

References

External links
Skou languages database at TransNewGuinea.org

 
Language families
Northwest Papuan languages
Languages of Sandaun Province